The Argentine PGA Championship is a golf tournament played in Argentina since 1920. It was generally supported by the leading Argentine golfers and its list of champions includes Eduardo Romero (8 times), José Jurado (7 times), Vicente Fernández (5 times), José Cóceres (twice) and Ángel Cabrera. However, the record holder is former British Open champion Roberto De Vicenzo, who recorded 16 victories between 1944 and 1985.

Winners

References 

Golf tournaments in Argentina
Former Tour de las Américas events